Cubitts, established in 2012, is an eyeglass manufacturer based in Kings Cross, London, England. The company creates handcrafted frames, and sunglasses, constructed with custom pins that secure the acetate based on a rivet designed by Lewis Cubitt, one of the three Cubitt brothers who inspired the brand name. The pin drilling process is done by hand, and takes time to perfect. It allows hinges to be easily maintained.

The brand has fifteen stores in the UK, and is expanding to other areas. Four of the stores offer bespoke and made-to-measure services. Cubitts also run spectacle making classes at their King's Cross workshop.

In July 2018, Cubitts launched a charity cleaning cloth designed by English artist Tracey Emin in aid of Terrence Higgins Trust. In June 2019, Cubitts released a spectacle cleaning cloth with graphic artist Camille Walala in aid of End Youth Homelessness.

The brand has collaborated with British heritage brand Sunspel on a capsule collection of sunglasses, and with fashion designer Phoebe English on two pairs of custom sustainable sunglasses, made from their workshop's waste.

In November 2018, Cubitts launched an exhibition charting London's six hundred-year history of spectacles at the St James's Market Pavilion. It included a frame made from items 'mudlarked' from the River Thames.

See also
William Cubitt
Lewis Cubitt
Thomas Cubitt

References

External links
Official site

Design companies established in 2012
Eyewear brands of the United Kingdom
Manufacturing companies established in 2012
Eyewear companies of the United Kingdom